Poker Face is a 2022 Australian-American thriller film written by, directed by and starring Russell Crowe. It co-stars Liam Hemsworth and RZA. The film had a limited theatrical release on November 16, 2022 and was released on demand on November 22, 2022.

Plot 
Jake Foley, a tech billionaire, holds a high-stakes poker night with his childhood friends. As the night goes on, it is revealed Foley wants his friends to expose secrets they have held their entire lives. Things go awry as thieves try to rob the game, and the friends must band together to survive.

Cast 
 Russell Crowe as Jake Foley
 Liam Hemsworth as Michael Nankervis
 RZA as Andrew Johnson
 Aden Young as Alex Harris
 Steve Bastoni as Paul Muccino
 Daniel MacPherson as Sam McIntyre
 Elsa Pataky as Penelope
 Paul Tassone as Victor 
 Matthew Nable as Billy
 Benedict Hardie as Styx
 Brooke Satchwell as Nicole Foley
 Molly Grace as Rebecca Foley

Release 
The film had a limited theatrical release on November 16, 2022 and was released on VOD by Screen Media on November 22, 2022.

Reception

Box office 
Poker Face grossed a worldwide total of $1.7 million.

Critical response 
On the review aggregator Rotten Tomatoes, the film has an approval rating of 9% based on 32 reviews, with a weighted average of 4.2/10. The site's critical consensus reads, "As Kenny Rogers told us, you've got to know when to fold 'em -- a warning Russell Crowe should have heeded when he got the script for Poker Face." On Metacritic, the film holds a score of 43 out of 100, based on 10 critics, indicating "mixed or average reviews".

Common Sense Media rated the film 3 out of 5 stars, while Glenn Kenny of RogerEbert.com gave it 2 stars, saying, "Even if you can sense the fun Crowe is having with the camera setups in certain scenes, "Poker Face" is simultaneously a lot and not all that much."

References

External links
 
 

2020s American films
2022 crime films
Films about poker
Films directed by Russell Crowe
Stan (service) original films